PFL  may refer to:

Science
 Pyruvate formate lyase, an enzyme important in the regulation of anaerobic glucose metabolism
 Positive feedback loop 
 posterior frontal lobe

Sport
 Peel Football League, an Australian rules football league
 Pioneer Football League, an NCAA Division I FCS football conference
 Professional Fighters League, an American mixed martial arts league
 Professional Futsal League, an American sports league
 Philippines Football League, an association football league in the Philippines
 Polish Football League, an American football league in Poland

Professional Football League
 First Professional Football League (Bulgaria)
 Professional Football League of Ukraine
 Russian Professional Football League
 TT Pro League, formerly the Professional Football League of Trinidad and Tobago
 Uzbekistan Super League

Language
 PFL, ISO 639-3 language code for the Palatine German language
 People-first language

Organisations
 Perth Freight Link, transport route for trucks to access Fremantle port starting at Muchea in Western Australia.
 Pacific Forum Line, a shipping alliance located in Nauru
 Partido da Frente Liberal (Liberal Front Party), a Brazilian political party
 Popular Front of Latvia, a former Latvian political party
 Priests for Life, an American-based Roman Catholic anti-abortion organization

Other
 Paid Family Leave (California), a California law that extends unemployment disability compensation
 Pre-fader listen, a sound mixer function used for making a Fade (audio engineering)